RV Atlantis is a , owned by the US Navy and operated by the Woods Hole Oceanographic Institution as part of the University-National Oceanographic Laboratory System (UNOLS) fleet. She is the host vessel of DSV Alvin.

Construction
Atlantis was built by Halter Marine Inc., Gulfport, Mississippi. She was laid down in August 1994 and launched in February 1996. She was delivered to the U.S. Navy on 25 February 1998, as RV Atlantis (AGOR-25) a Thomas G. Thompson-class oceanographic research ship.

Atlantis completed a year long midlife maintenance and refit at Dakota Creek Shipyard in July 2021.

Deck equipment
 Winches
 Traction - 30,000' .68" EM or 9/16" wire
 Hydro - 33,000' 3-cond. EM or 1/4" wire
 Heavy Equipment
 Cranes - two @ 42,000 lbs. cap
 HIAB cranes (2)
 Midships hydro boom

Miscellaneous on-board equipment
 Laboratories: 
 Portable Van Space: At least six . vans
 Sewage System: Envirovac flushing system

Sister ships
The Atlantis and three other research ships were all built to the same basic design. The three sister ships are RV Thomas G. Thompson (UW), RV Roger Revelle (Scripps) and NOAAS Ronald H. Brown (NOAA).

References

 NavSource Online: Service Ship Photo Archive - AGOR-25 Atlantis
 R/V Atlantis Specifications
 Where are the Ships Now?

External links

 WHOI Marine Operations
 Ship's location

 

University-National Oceanographic Laboratory System research vessels
Thomas G. Thompson-class oceanographic research ships
Ships built in Gulfport, Mississippi
1996 ships
Woods Hole Oceanographic Institution